Cynisca kigomensis is a worm lizard species in the family Amphisbaenidae. It is endemic to Nigeria.

References

Cynisca (lizard)
Reptiles described in 1968
Taxa named by Gerald T. Dunger
Endemic fauna of Nigeria
Reptiles of Nigeria